Crozes-Hermitage is a commune in the Drôme department in southeastern France.

Population

Wine

Wine is produced under the Crozes-Hermitage AOC designation.

See also
Communes of the Drôme department

References

Communes of Drôme